The Afterlove Tour is the fifth concert tour by British recording artist James Blunt. Launched in support of his fifth studio album, The Afterlove (2017). Beginning October 2017, the tour is set to play over 100 shows in Europe, Asia, Australasia and South America.

Background
Blunt mentioned touring alongside his album announcement in December 2016. A month later, shows in Europe were announced for the fall of 2017. During the summer, Blunt joined Ed Sheeran on the North American leg of his tour. After this stint with Sheeran, Blunt revealed shows in Australia and New Zealand.

Opening acts
Jamie Lawson 
Morgan Evans 
Mainfelt 
Madison Violet 
Mattia De Simone

Setlist
The following setlist was obtained from the 18 October 2017 concert, held at the Lanxess Arena in Cologne, Germany. It does not represent all concerts for the duration of the tour.
"Heart to Heart"
"I'll Take Everything"
"Wisemen"
"Heartbeat"
"Someone Singing Along"
"Lose My Number"
"Carry You Home"
"Postcards"
"Make Me Better"
"Goodbye My Lover"
"Time of Our Lives"
"High"
"You're Beautiful"
"Bartender"
"OK"
"Same Mistake"
Encore
"Don't Give Me Those Eyes"
"Stay the Night"
"1973"
"Bonfire Heart"

Tour dates

Festivals and other miscellaneous performances

This concert was a part of "A Day on the Green"
This concert was a part of the "Jelling Musikfestival"
This concert was a part of the "NDR 2 Plaza Festival"
This concert was a part of the "Independence Day Festival"
This concert was a part of "Live at Chelsea"
This concert was a part of "Newmarket Nights"
This concert was a part of the "Rankweiler Open Air"
This concert was a part of the "Festival Blues Passions de Cognac"
This concert was a part of the "Festival Pause Guitare"
This concert was a part of the "Pistoia Blues Festival"
This concert was a part of "Moon and Stars"
This concert was a part of the "Carpi Summer Fest"
This concert was a part of the "Roma Summer Fest"
This concert was a part of "Pori Jazz"
This concert was a part of the "Regionalwerk Bodensee-Schlossgarten Open Air"
This concert was a part of "Raiffeisen Kultursommer"
This concert was a part of "KSK Music Open"
This concert was a part of the "Starlite Festival"
This concert was a part of the "Arenal Sound Festival"
This concert was a part of the "Cap Roig Festival"
This concert was a part of "SommerMusik"
This concert was a part of the "Brenzpark-Festival"
This concert was a part of "Stars in Town"
This concert was a part of the "Heitere Open Air"
This concert was a part of "Rock Oz'Arènes"
This concert was a part of the "Afrika-Karibik-Festival"
This concert was a part of the "Zeltfestival Ruhr"
This concert was a part of the "HUK-Open-Air-Sommer"
This concert is a part of "Cerbul de Aur"
This concert is a part of the "NDR 2 Papenburg Festival"
This concert is a part of "IFA-Konzerte unter dem Funkturm"
This concert is a part of "Havířovské slavnosti"
This concert is a part of the "Bath Cup Festival"

Cancellations and rescheduled shows

Box office score data

References

2017 concert tours
2018 concert tours
James Blunt